Moulton End is a hamlet in North Yorkshire, in England.

The hamlet gradually built up around the now disused railway station formerly serving North Cowton. The station was part of the disbanded Eryholme-Richmond branch line, which also used to serve Catterick Garrison. The station building is now a residential property, the platform clock is still visible on the wall of the Station house. The Darlington-bound platform still survives, but it is heavily overgrown with trees and bushes. The Richmond platform has been incorporated into a boundary wall to Station House.

References

Villages in North Yorkshire